Robert Paris (born 19 June 1978) is a former footballer who played for a host of non-league clubs and the Anguilla national team.

Club career
Paris began his career with Slough Town, under the management of Brian McDermott. The defender joined the club ahead of the 1996–97 season. After a spell with Beaconsfield SYCOB, he then joined Northwood, and managed 18 appearances.

After impressing manager Cliff Hercules, Paris joined Aylesbury United midway through the 2001–02 campaign. Scoring four goals in 28 games, he was released when new manager Steve Cordery took over. Upon his departure, Paris moved to Hampton & Richmond Borough ahead of the 2003–04 season.

Joining Kingstonian in January 2005, he scored two goals in 18 games. Making his debut on New Years Day 2005 in a 2–0 defeat to Yeading, he found the net against Tonbridge Angels and AFC Wimbledon in the coming weeks. Paris remained with the K's until the end of the 2004–05 season.

The defender then returned Hampton & Richmond Borough in July 2005, where he remained for three years. Paris joined Isthmian Division One South side Walton Casuals on loan in October 2007, but only managed two games for the club before his return.

In March 2008, he signed for Wealdstone on a dual registration with Hampton & Richmond Borough. After suffering a knee injury, Hampton & Richmond supporters raised over £1,000 to fund the operation shortly before his departure.

Paris joined Burnham in July 2008, where he stayed for three seasons. He later moved to East Berks Premier Division side Eton Wick, where he was ever present throughout the season. However, after being left on the bench for the 2012 Maidenhead Norfolkian's Senior Cup Final and East Berks League Cup, he walked out the ground in protest and refused to play for the club again.

International career
Paris made his international debut for Anguilla on 6 February 2008, playing in a 12–0 defeat to El Salvador during the 2010 World Cup qualifiers. He also played in the return match, which ended in a 4–0 defeat three days later.

References

External links
 Player profile – Hampton & Richmond Borough
 

1978 births
Living people
People from Bracknell
Anguillan footballers
English footballers
Anguilla international footballers
Association football defenders
Slough Town F.C. players
Beaconsfield Town F.C. players
Northwood F.C. players
Aylesbury United F.C. players
Maidenhead United F.C. players
Hampton & Richmond Borough F.C. players
Kingstonian F.C. players
Walton Casuals F.C. players
Burnham F.C. players
Eton Wick F.C. players
Isthmian League players